Laure Werner (born 22 February 1981) is a road cyclist from Belgium. She represented her nation at the 2005, 2006 and 2008 UCI Road World Championships.

References

External links
 profile at Procyclingstats.com

1981 births
Belgian female cyclists
Living people
Place of birth missing (living people)
People from Etterbeek
Cyclists from Brussels
21st-century Belgian women